Buddy Banks may refer to:

Buddy Banks (saxophonist) (1909–1991), American jazz tenor saxophonist, pianist, and bandleader
Buddy Banks (bassist) (1927–2005), Canadian jazz double-bassist